Dina Gralla (born Hedwig Dieckmann; 15 January 1905 – 11 November 1994) was a German film actress.

Gralla was born Hedwig Dieckmann in Warsaw to German parents. She received dance training in 1919 and performed as a ballet dancer at the revues at the Berlin Wintergarten theatre. After taking private acting lessons from Walter Steinbeck, director Richard Eichberg cast her his 1925 drama film Leidenschaft before appearing in a number of silent films and into the sound era of the early 1930s. Her last film appearance was a small role in the 1954 Erik Ode directed drama Ten on Every Finger (1954).

Selected filmography
 The Wife of Forty Years (1925)
 The Girl on the Road (1925)
 Passion (1925)
 The Woman with That Certain Something (1925)
 Princess Trulala (1926)
 Our Daily Bread (1926)
 Virtue (1926)
 Madame Wants No Children (1926)
 The Prince of Pappenheim (1927)
 The Most Beautiful Legs of Berlin (1927)
 Schweik in Civilian Life (1927)
 How Do I Marry the Boss? (1927)
 Im Luxuszug (1927)
 The Page Boy at the Golden Lion (1928)
 The Woman from Till 12 (1928)
 The Old Fritz (1928)
 Come Back, All Is Forgiven (1929)
 Mischievous Miss (1930)
 The Love Express (1931)
 Without Meyer, No Celebration is Complete (1931)
 The Soaring Maiden (1931)
 Children of Fortune (1931)
 An Auto and No Money (1932)
 Ten on Every Finger (1954)

Bibliography
 Jung, Uli & Schatzberg, Walter. Beyond Caligari: The Films of Robert Wiene. Berghahn Books, 1999.

External links

1905 births
1994 deaths
German film actresses
German silent film actresses
Actresses from Warsaw
20th-century German actresses
German expatriates in the Russian Empire